Bello is a municipality located in the province of Teruel, Aragon, Spain. According to the 2003 census (INE), the municipality has a population of 369 inhabitants.

This town is located close to the Laguna de Gallocanta natural lake.

References 

Municipalities in the Province of Teruel